Simone Follet (23 January 1935 – 16 February 2021) was a French epigrapher and philologist, specialising in Roman Greece, especially Athens.

Life
Follet attended lycée at Mâcon and at Versailles. In 1955, she enrolled in the École normale supérieure de jeunes filles in Sèvres, studying literature. After her graduation in 1958, Follet worked at the University of Clermont-Ferrand until 1961, when she returned to the École normale supérieure to study Ancient Greek philology and literature.

In 1975, Follet became the adjunct director of the École normale supérieure, a post which she retained until 1987. From 1981 to 1985, she was also the director of a CNRS project called "Etude de textes sophistiques et techniques tardifs" (Study of Sophistic Texts and Late Techniques), based at the École normale supérieure. In this role, she was noted for her mentorship of younger female scholars of Classical philology.

She was then a professor at Caen, Nanterre, and Paris-Sorbonne. After her retirement in 2000, she remained an emirita professor of the Sorbonne. She was elected President of the French  (Association for Hellenic Studies) for 2001.

Research
Follet's research focussed on the epigraphy of Roman Imperial Athens. Her 1976 book Athènes au IIe et au IIIe siècle. Études chronologiques et prosopographiques (Athens in the 2nd and 3rd centuries: Chronological and Prosopographic Studies), developed from her doctoral thesis, remains the standard work on the chronology of Imperial-period Athens. Follet produced numerous articles and book chapters on individual inscriptions or groups of inscriptions, often in collaboration with Dina Peppas Delmousou of the Epigraphical Museum.

Follet also worked on imperial-period Greek literature and philosophy, especially the second Sophistic author Philostratus, publishing the standard French edition of his Heroicus in 2017 and collaborating with Bernadette Peuch on a standard edition of his Lives of the Sophists, which will be published posthumously. She also contributed to work on a standard edition of Callistratus's Descriptions and provided entries for the Dictionnaire des Philosophes Antiques.

References

Bibliography

1935 births
2021 deaths
French epigraphers
French hellenists
École Normale Supérieure alumni
Academic staff of the École Normale Supérieure
Academic staff of the University of Caen Normandy
Academic staff of Paris Nanterre University
Academic staff of Paris-Sorbonne University